Angke station is a railway station located in Tambora, West Jakarta, Indonesia. It is served by the Cikarang Loop Line of the KRL Commuterline. This station has three tracks with tracks 2 and 3 as the through tracks.

In early 2008, the station was cleared from hundreds of illegal huts on the land near the station.

Before February 2017, this station was used for the beginning and end of local train trips serving Banten, such as Langsam, Banten Express, and Patas Merak, while the KRL Commuterline ran without stopping at this station. For Kalimaya and Rangkas Jaya trains, the beginning and end of the trip remained from Tanah Abang Station.

Since February 2017 the station has been reactivated for KRL with Angke-Bogor, Angke-Depok, and Angke-Nambo routes. All local trains that previously serve this station were combined as Lokal Merak train and the relation was changed to Rangkasbitung-Merak.

History 
This station was inaugurated by the Staatsspoorwegen on January 2, 1899, along with the operational of the Batavia–Rangkasbitung railway.

Initially, the line from Batavia Zuid Station headed to Angke was built via Jalan Pasar Asemka. When a new route was made from Angke which made a detour through the Kota Intan and Kampung Bandan areas, the route from Batavia Zuid Station to Jalan Pasar Asemka was cutted (only cut off). Then, a station was established on Jalan Pasar Asemka which was named Pasar Pagi Station, this station is used as the initial point of departure for passenger trains heading to the Tangerang Station.

The station along with this line was dismantled at one time, then its former location has become the Asemka Market and Jalan Asemka Raya overpass. There are still remainings from this route that can still be seen, namely 2 pieces of the foundation for the rail bridge from the Krukut River which is located under the Jalan Asemka Raya overpass.

In the 1970s, the emplacement of this station was thought to have multiple lines and a branch line.  At that time, lines 2 and 3 were straight tracks used for passing trains, while lines 1 and 4 were passing loop. It is also estimated that there are 2 rail siding locations that are used for storing or stabling a series of freight cars. The first save track is located next to line 4, with 2 dead ends or badug lines. And for the second track, it is in the left corner of the station emplacement from the direction of Duri Station, with 3 dead-end rails or buffer stops. This station also has 2 branch rails, the first leads to a warehouse, and the second possibly leads to a soap factory from Kampung Bandan Station. It is not yet known exactly when the branching and storage tracks at the station emplacement were dismantled, so that there are absolutely no traces left.

In 1987, the Manggarai–Kampung Bandan via Tanah Abang railway was electrified. At that time, only lines 2 and 3 were electrified at this station. Meanwhile, line 1 was not electrified for the reason of preserving the station canopy building, while line 4 was not electrified, because the line was not used for boarding and alighting passengers.

Until the late 1990s, this station using a canopy. However, this canopy only accommodates lane 1 only. This canopy was then removed and moved to Parung Panjang Station.

Currently this station only has 3 tracks, with lines 2 and 3 as straight tracks, and line 1 as turning tracks. The station building is also large in size, because the top floor of the station building is used as a market and shops.

Building and layout

Services
The following is a list of train services at the Angke Station.

Passenger services 
 KAI Commuter
  Cikarang Loop Line (Full Racket)

Intermodal support

Places of interest 
 An-Nawier Mosque
 Kalijodo Park

Gallery

References

External links

West Jakarta
Railway stations in Jakarta
Railway stations opened in 1899
1899 establishments in the Dutch East Indies